Magrahat Paschim Assembly constituency is a Legislative Assembly constituency of South 24 Parganas district in the Indian State of West Bengal.

Overview
As per order of the Delimitation Commission in respect of the Delimitation of constituencies in the West Bengal, Magrahat Paschim Assembly constituency is composed of the following:
 Magrahat I community development block
 Netra gram panchayat of Diamond Harbour I community development block

Magrahat Paschim Assembly constituency is a part of No. 20 Mathurapur (Lok Sabha constituency).

Members of Legislative Assembly

Election results

Legislative Assembly Election 2011

Legislative Assembly Elections 1977-2006
In 2006, Abul Hasnat of CPI(M) won the Magrahat Paschim Assembly constituency defeating his nearest rival Giasuddin Molla of AITC. Noorar Rahaman of CPI(M) defeated Giasuddin Molla of AITC in 2001. Abul Basar Laskar of INC defeated Anuradha Putatunda of CPI(M) in 1996. Anuradha Putatunda of CPI(M) defeated Abdul Basar Laskar of INC in 1991. Abdus Sobhan Gazi of CPI(M) defeated Kironmoy Deb of INC in 1987, and Sudhendu Mundle of INC in 1982 and 1977.

Legislative Assembly Elections 1952-1972
Sudhendu Mundle of INC won in 1972 and 1971. Sachindranath Mondal of Bangla Congress won in 1969. Jainul Abedin of Bangla Congress won in 1967. Abdul Hashem of INC won in 1962. In 1957 and 1952, Magrahat Assembly constituency had joint seats. In 1957, Abdul Hashem and Ardhendu Sekhar Naskar, both of INC, won. In 1952, Abdul Hashem and Ardhendu Sekhar Naskar, both of INC, won.

References

Notes

Citations

Assembly constituencies of West Bengal
Politics of South 24 Parganas district